Wheatley Provincial Park is a protected area in the municipality of Chatham–Kent in Southwestern Ontario, Canada. Visitors to nearby Point Pelee National Park often camp at the park.

A number of small creeks flow through the park which provide opportunities for canoeing and viewing waterfowl, though over the past 10 years the inlet and creeks that dominate the park have mostly dried up. The park has four campgrounds: Boosey Creek, Highlands, Middle Creek and Two Creeks, offering both electrical and non-electrical campsites as well as group camping and radio-free camping.

Gallery

References

External links

Parks in Chatham-Kent
Provincial parks of Ontario
Temperate broadleaf and mixed forests in Canada
Forests of Ontario
Protected areas established in 1971
1971 establishments in Ontario